Communauté d'agglomération Seine-Eure is an intercommunal structure, centred on the city of Louviers. It is located in the Eure department, in the Normandy region, northern France. It was created in September 2019. Its seat is in Louviers. Its population was 103,496 in 2017, of which 18,648 in Louviers proper.

Composition
The communauté d'agglomération consists of the following 60 communes:

Acquigny
Ailly
Alizay
Amfreville-sous-les-Monts
Amfreville-sur-Iton
Andé
Autheuil-Authouillet
Le Bec-Thomas
Cailly-sur-Eure
Champenard
Clef-Vallée-d'Eure
Connelles
Courcelles-sur-Seine
Crasville
Criquebeuf-sur-Seine
Les Damps
Fontaine-Bellenger
Gaillon
La Harengère
La Haye-le-Comte
La Haye-Malherbe
Herqueville
Heudebouville
Heudreville-sur-Eure
Igoville
Incarville
Léry
Louviers
Mandeville
Le Manoir
Martot
Le Mesnil-Jourdain
Pinterville
Pîtres
Pont-de-l'Arche
Porte-de-Seine
Poses
Quatremare
Saint-Aubin-sur-Gaillon
Saint-Cyr-la-Campagne
Saint-Didier-des-Bois
Saint-Étienne-du-Vauvray
Saint-Étienne-sous-Bailleul
Saint-Germain-de-Pasquier
Saint-Julien-de-la-Liègue
Saint-Pierre-de-Bailleul
Saint-Pierre-du-Vauvray
Saint-Pierre-la-Garenne
La Saussaye
Surtauville
Surville
Terres de Bord
Les Trois Lacs
La Vacherie
Val-de-Reuil
Le Val-d'Hazey
Le Vaudreuil
Villers-sur-le-Roule
Vironvay
Vraiville

References

Seine-Eure
Seine-Eure